Aai Phirse Bahar is a 1960 Indian Hindi-language film which was directed by A. Bhimsingh and starred by Padmini and Sivaji Ganesan as the leading characters.

Plot 
The film revolves around Rani (Padmini) who became widow at a very young age. During the 1950s, widowed women were by tradition not allowed to wear ornaments and lead a normal life; Rani was of no exception.

Cast

Soundtrack

References 

1960 films
1960s Hindi-language films